Gelar (also Romanized as Gelār) is a village in Bid Shahr Rural District, Bidshahr district, Evaz County, Fars Province, Iran. At the 2006 census, its population was 796, in 148 families.

References 

Populated places in Evaz County